Antoni Sivera (born 13 April 1978) is an Andorran international footballer.

External links

Andorran footballers
Andorra international footballers
1978 births
Living people
Luzenac AP players
FC Santa Coloma players
Association football midfielders
Andorran expatriate footballers
Expatriate footballers in France
Expatriate footballers in Spain
FC Andorra players